Sangili Murugan, is an Indian actor, screenwriter and producer. During the 1980s and 1990s, he was an actor doing negative and supporting roles in Tamil films. He has also worked as production controller in a number of films. His birth name is Muthuvel Murugan; the prefix "Sangili" was added to his name after the famous character in his second film Oru Kai Osai.His first movie was Suvar illatha Chitthirangal, which was also the first movie of K.Bhagyaraj. He is the founder of the production and distribution company, Murugan Cine Arts, and has produced over 12 films.

Filmography

Producer

Distributor

Actor
A list of films in which Sangili Murugan has acted in:

References

Male actors in Tamil cinema
Living people
Male actors from Madurai
Tamil film producers
20th-century Indian male actors
21st-century Indian male actors
Film producers from Tamil Nadu
1945 births